Skon may refer to:

 Skön Court District, Sweden
 Skon, Cambodia